is a 1961 superhero film produced by Toei Company Ltd. The film stars Sonny Chiba as Iron Sharp (called Space Chief in the U.S. version).

The film was released in 1961 in Japan and was later released in 1964 direct to television in the United States. In 1998, the film was featured on an episode of Mystery Science Theater 3000.

Plot 
Astronomer Shinichi Tachibana has a secret identity as superhero "Iron Sharp" and has many children as friends. When they are attacked by a group of metallic aliens ("Neptune Men" in English), Iron Sharp drives the aliens away. The resourceful Tachibana helps develop an electric barrier to block the aliens from coming to the Earth.  After several losses by the aliens, they announce that they will invade the Earth, throwing the world into a state of panic. The aliens destroy entire cities with their mothership and smaller fighters. After Iron Sharp destroys multiple enemy ships, Japan fires nuclear missiles at the mothership, destroying it.

Cast 
Sonny Chiba as scientist Shinichi Tachibana / Iron Sharp
Kappei Matsumoto as Dr. Tanigawa 
Ryuko Minakami as Yōko (Tanigawa's daughter)
Shinjirō Ehara as scientist Yanagida
Mitsue Komiya as scientist Saitō

Style
Invasion of the Neptune Men is part of Japan's tokusatsu genre, which involves science fiction and/or superhero films that feature heavy use of special effects.

Production 

Invasion of the Neptune Men was an early film for Sonny Chiba. Chiba started working in Japanese television where he starred in superhero television series in 1960. Chiba continued working back and forth between television and film until the late 1960s when he became a more popular star.

Release 
Uchū Kaisokusen was released in Japan on 19 July 1961. The film was not released theatrically in the United States, but it was released directly to American television by Walter Manley on March 20, 1964, dubbed in English and retitled Invasion of the Neptune Men.

The film was also released as Space Chief, Space Greyhound and Invasion from a Planet.

Reception and legacy 
In later reviews of the film, Bruce Eder gave the film a one-star rating out of five, stating that the film was "the kind of movie that gave Japanese science fiction films a bad name. The low-quality special effects, the non-existent acting, the bad dubbing, and the chaotic plotting and pacing were all of a piece with what critics had been saying, erroneously, about the Godzilla movies for years." The review referred to the film's "cheesy special effects and ridiculous dialogue taking on a sort of so-bad-they're-good charm", and described the film as a "thoroughly memorable (if not necessarily enjoyable, outside of the MST3K continuum) specimen of bad cinema."

On October 11, 1997 the film was shown on the movie-mocking television show Mystery Science Theater 3000. In his review of the film, Bruce Eder of AllMovie described the episode as a memorable one, specifically the cast watching the repetitive aerial dogfights between spaceships, and one of the hosts remarking that "Independence Day seems a richly nuanced movie". Criticism of the film included excessive use of WWII stock footage in the action scenes (especially the obviously noticeable shot featuring a picture of Adolf Hitler in one building).

In his book Japanese Science Fiction, Fantasy and Horror Films, Stuart Galbraith IV stated that the film "had a few surprises" despite a "woefully familiar script". Galbraith noted that the film was not as over-the-top as Prince of Space and that the opticals in the film were as strong as anything Toho had produced at the time. Galbraith suggested the effects may have been lifted from Toei's The Final War (aka World War III Breaks Out) from 1961.

See also 
 List of Japanese films of 1961
 List of Mystery Science Theater 3000 episodes
 List of science fiction films of the 1960s

Notes

References

Footnotes

Sources

External links 
 
 
 Invasion of the Neptune Men at allcinema in Japanese
 Invasion of the Neptune Men at Japanese cinema db in Japanese
 Invasion of the Neptune Men at Kinenote in Japanese

1961 films
1960s science fiction films
Alien invasions in films
1960s Japanese-language films
Neptune in film
Japanese science fiction films
1960s Japanese films
1960s superhero films
Japanese superhero films
Toei tokusatsu films
Transforming heroes
Japanese black-and-white films
Collage film